Without Witnesses (German: Ohne Zeugen) is a 1919 Austrian silent drama film directed by Erwin Baron and Georg Kundert and starring Grete Lundt, Fritz Kortner and Hans Siebert.

Cast
 Grete Lundt
 Fritz Kortner
 Hans Siebert
 Erwin Baron
 Josef Reithofer
 Theodor Danegger
 Julius Strobl

References

Bibliography
 Bock, Hans-Michael & Bergfelder, Tim. The Concise CineGraph. Encyclopedia of German Cinema. Berghahn Books, 2009.

External links

1919 films
Austrian silent feature films
Austrian drama films
Austrian black-and-white films
1919 drama films
Silent drama films
1910s German-language films